Deal or No Deal Nigeria was the Nigerian adaptation of the international game show format Deal or No Deal.  It aired on M-Net Africa on Saturdays at 18:00.  The first series started on July 7, 2007, and finished on December 29, 2007.  One-time Football player and TV presenter John Fashanu was the host.  As in many other versions, models hold 26 cases, with values going up to US$100,000.

Case Values

International Broadcasts

Deal or No Deal Nigeria was previously aired on UK station The Africa Channel.

Deal or No Deal
2007 Nigerian television series debuts
2007 Nigerian television series endings
2000s Nigerian television series
M-Net original programming